Neobisnius is a genus of large rove beetles in the family Staphylinidae. There are at least 20 described species in Neobisnius.

Species
These 22 species belong to the genus Neobisnius:

 Neobisnius chengkouensis Zheng, 1994 c g
 Neobisnius formosae Cameron, 1949 c g
 Neobisnius gratus b
 Neobisnius inornatus Sharp, 1889 c g
 Neobisnius jocosus b
 Neobisnius jucundus (Horn, 1884) g
 Neobisnius lathrobioides (Baudi, 1848) g
 Neobisnius nigripes Bernhauer, 1941 c g
 Neobisnius occidentoides Frank, 1981 g b
 Neobisnius oculatus Fauvel, 1905 g
 Neobisnius orbus (Kiesenwetter, 1850) g
 Neobisnius paederoides b
 Neobisnius praelongus Gemminger & Harold, 1868 c g
 Neobisnius procerulus Gravenhorst, 1806 c g
 Neobisnius prolixus Erichson, 1840 c g
 Neobisnius protenus Schubert, 1906 c g
 Neobisnius pumilis Sharp, 1874 c g
 Neobisnius pumilus (Sharp) g
 Neobisnius senilis (Horn, 1884) g
 Neobisnius sobrinus (Erichson, 1840) g b
 Neobisnius terminalis (LeConte, 1863) g b
 Neobisnius villosulus (Stephens, 1833) g

Data sources: i = ITIS, c = Catalogue of Life, g = GBIF, b = Bugguide.net

References

Further reading

External links

 

Staphylininae